Choke Beat Orchestra is a Tel-Aviv based hip hop musical band led by the controllerism artist Adi Rotem (AKA Choke). It was founded in September 2015.  In 2017, the band performed on International Music Showcase Festival 2017.

Albums

References

External links 
 Official website
 Choke Beat Orchestra on Facebook
 Choke Beat Orchestra on YouTube

Israeli hip hop groups
Musical groups established in 2015
2015 establishments in Israel